Ammassalik wooden maps are carved, tactile maps of the Greenlandic coastlines. In the 1880s, Gustav Holm led an expedition to the Ammassalik coast of eastern Greenland, where he met several Tunumiit, or Eastern Greenland Inuit communities, who had had no prior direct contact with Europeans.

History
Kunit approached Holm on February 8, 1885, and sold the maps representing the coast from Sermiligak to Kangerdlugsuatsiak. Kunit returned on March 21 with another piece representing the peninsula between Sermiligak and Kangerdluarsikajik.

Upon Holm's return, the maps were deposited along with the rest of the collection at the National Museum of Denmark in Copenhagen. As of 1948 the maps were still in Copenhagen; copies were deposited in the Musée d'Ethnographie du Trocadéro in Paris. At some point the maps were transferred to the Greenland National Museum in Nuuk, which was established in the mid-1960s.  write that the "only other known example" of such a map is a specimen at the Michigan State University Museum — item 896.7, 62154 — which is probably a copy of Kunit's work.

In 2000, Post Greenland issued a stamp designed by Anne-Birthe Hove featuring the coastal map, as part of its "Greenland's Cultural Heritage" series.
The Greenland National Museum loaned out the maps for a 2007-8 exhibition at the Field Museum of Natural History in Chicago entitled Maps: Finding Our Place in the World, which also traveled to the Walters Art Museum in Baltimore.

Features

Related maps
Marshall Islands stick chart
Straight-line diagram

Notes

References

Further reading

1880s works
Historic maps of the Americas
Geography of Greenland
Maps of North America
Greenland
Indigenous woodcarving of the Americas
Inuit tools